Yuliana Telegina (born March 22, 2002 in Russia) is an Israeli individual and group rhythmic gymnast. She is the 2020 European Group All-around champion.

Career

Junior
Yuliana was a member of junior team that represented Israel at the 2016 Junior European Championships in Holon, Israel and placed 4th in Team competition. She qualified to two apparatus, where she finished on 4th place (Rope) and 8th place (Clubs). In 2017, she joined Israeli junior group and competed at International Tournament Alina Cup in Moscow, where they took silver medal in Group All-around behind Russia. At the 2017 Junior European Championships in Budapest, Hungary they won silver medal in 10 Clubs final.

Senior
In 2018, she became senior. She competed at World Cup Pesaro and ended on 12th place in All-around. She competed as individual gymnast and helped her teammates Linoy Ashram and Nicol Zelikman placing 4th in Team competition at the 2018 World Championships in Sofia, Bulgaria, competing with Hoop and Ball. 
She placed 4th in All-around at the 2019 Israeli National Championships. She replaced Linoy Ashram at the 2019 European Championships in Baku, Azerbaijan and finished 14th in All-around. Her second World Championships participation was in 2019 in Baku, where she and her teammates Linoy Ashram, Nicol Zelikman and Nicol Voronkov won silver medal in Team competition. She ended on 25th place in Ribbon Qualification.

In 2020, she joined Israeli senior group and competed at Grand Prix Moscow. In November, they won gold medal at the 2020 European Championships in Group All-around and silver in Team competition.

References

External links
 
 
 

Israeli rhythmic gymnasts
2002 births
Living people
Medalists at the Rhythmic Gymnastics European Championships
Olympic gymnasts of Israel
Gymnasts at the 2020 Summer Olympics